Kovid is a personal name of Asian (mostly Indian or Thai) origin

Kovid may refer to:

 Kovid Foythong (born 1977), former Thai football player
 Kovid Gupta (born 1988), American author, screenwriter, filmmaker, and social activist
 Ram Nath Kovind

See also
 Coronavirus disease (COVID), a category of diseases caused by different coronaviruses
 Coronavirus disease 2019 (COVID-19), a coronavirus disease that resulted in the COVID-19 pandemic
 COVID-19 pandemic, an ongoing global pandemic of the above